Eberhard Encke (27 October 1881 – 22 October 1936) was a German sculptor. His work was part of the art competitions at the 1928 Summer Olympics and the 1936 Summer Olympics.

References

1881 births
1936 deaths
20th-century German sculptors
20th-century German male artists
German male sculptors
Olympic competitors in art competitions
People from Potsdam